Palakkuzhi is a village in Alathur taluk of Palakkad district, Kerala State. Vadakkenchery is the nearest town and is 14 km away from here.

Tourism Attraction

Thindillam waterfalls is a major people attraction spot. The village is covered by lush green hill slopes of coffee and rubber plantations. This place rubs border with the Peechi Wildlife sanctuary

Hydel Power plan

The Palakkad district panchayat has begun efforts to establish a power project at the Thindillam waterfalls at Palakkuzhi. Four acres would be acquired for the project and the project aims to generate 3.78 MW at the initial stage and the panchayat would sell the generated power to Kerala State Electricity Board

Transportation

Kerala State Road Transport Corporation has few schedules to Palakkuzhi and there are other Private operators too.

St. Thomas Church, Palakkuzhi is located here

This town connects to other parts of India through Palakkad city.  National Highway No.544 connects to Coimbatore and Bangalore.  Other parts of Kerala is accessed through National Highway No.66 going through Thrissur.  Calicut International Airport, Cochin International Airport and Coimbatore Airport  are the nearest airports. Shoranur Junction railway station is the nearest major railway station.

References

Cities and towns in Palakkad district